Begül Löklüoğlu (born 28 August 1988 in Ankara, Turkey) is a Turkish female archer competing in the recurve event.

She was born to sporting parents, her father is the archery federation's representative in Antalya and her mother a former volleyball player. Begül started archery at the age of 13. Her brother Berkay, who is two years younger, also competes in archery. She was educated in physical education and sports at Akdeniz University's Vocational College in Antalya.

At the 2012 European Archery Championships held in Amsterdam, Netherlands, Löklüoğlu won the bronze medal in the mixed team category along with Yağız Yılmaz.

She qualified for the 2012 Summer Olympics after winning the bronze medal at the 2012 FITA Archery World Cup's Stage 3 in Ogden, Utah, USA.

Löklüoğlu won the recurve women event at the 2012 European Grand Prix Archery's 2nd leg held in Sofia, Bulgaria beating her opponent Ksenia Perova from Russia with a score 6–4.

Achievements

References

1988 births
Sportspeople from Ankara
Living people
Akdeniz University alumni
Turkish female archers
Olympic archers of Turkey
Archers at the 2012 Summer Olympics
Izmir Büyükşehir Belediyespor athletes
21st-century Turkish sportswomen